Alfred Wesley Milch (November 30, 1919 – November 3, 2010) was an American football coach.  He was the seventh head football coach at Arlington State College—now known as the University of Texas at Arlington—serving for one season, in 1951, and compiling a record of 3–4–1.  The school discontinued its football team after completion of the 1985 season.

References

External links
 

1919 births
2010 deaths
Sul Ross Lobos football coaches
Texas–Arlington Mavericks football coaches
Sportspeople from Norfolk, Virginia